Ciara Fowler (born 16 July 2001) is an Australian football (soccer) player, who currently plays for Adelaide United in the Australian W-League.

Club career
Fowler made her debut for Adelaide United on 14 November 2019 during a match against Western Sydney Wanderers.

International career
Fowler represented Ireland on youth national teams in 2018–19. In 2019, she was named to the Australias under-20 national team squad for the 2019 AFC U-19 Women's Championship in Thailand, the qualifier tournament for the 2020 FIFA U-20 Women's World Cup. She made her debut for the Young Matildas during a 5–1 loss against North Korea.

Personal life
Fowler's father is Irish and her mother is from Papua New Guinea. She was raised in a family of talented soccer players, with her brother, Caoimhin (Quivi) and sister, Mary both having played for the Irish youth team.

Her sister Mary began her professional career together with Ciara, when they were both signed for Adelaide United in the same year. They made their respective debuts for the squad during the same match.

References

External links
 Adelaide United player profile
 
 

2001 births
Living people
Australian women's soccer players
Adelaide United FC (A-League Women) players
Sportswomen from South Australia
Women's association football midfielders
Australian people of Irish descent
Australian people of Papua New Guinean descent
Sportspeople from Cairns
Soccer players from Queensland